Scandinavian Journal of Surgery is a peer-reviewed academic journal that publishes papers in the field of surgery. The journal's editor-in-chief is Ari Leppäniemi (Meilahti Hospital, Finland). It has been in publication since 1919 and is currently published by SAGE Publications on behalf of the Finnish Surgical Society.

Abstracting and indexing 
Scandinavian Journal of Surgery is abstracted and indexed in, among other databases:  SCOPUS, and the Social Sciences Citation Index. According to the Journal Citation Reports, its 2012 impact factor is 1.169, ranking it 118 out of 199 journals in the category ‘Surgery’.

References

External links 
 
 Finnish Surgical Society

SAGE Publishing academic journals
English-language journals